Willis Sherman "Bill" Bates (January 26, 1880 – May 13, 1939) was an American football and basketball coach.  He served as the head football coach at Fairmount College—now known as Wichita State University—from 1905 to 1908 and at Southwestern College in Winfield, Kansas from 1914 to 1925, compiling a career college football record of 81–49–12.  He also coached basketball at Fairmount (1905–1908) and Southwestern (1914–1926), tallying a career college basketball mark of 179–79.

Coaching career

Fairmount
Bates was the sixth head football coach for Fairmount College, now Wichita State University, located in Wichita, Kansas and he held that position for four seasons, from 1905 until 1908.  His overall coaching record at Fairmount was 28–8–3.  This ranks him second at Fairmont/Wichita State in terms of total wins and third at Wichita State in terms of winning percentage.

Night game
Bates was the head coach for the 1905 Cooper vs. Fairmount football game played on October 6, 1905 at Association Field in Wichita  The game was played at night under gas lamps as a demonstration by the Coleman Company and was the first night football game played west of the Mississippi River.  Fairmount won by a score of 24–0.

Experimental game
Bates was the head coach for Fairmount in the 1905 Washburn vs. Fairmount football game that took place on December 25, 1905.  The game was played against the Washburn Ichabods using a set of experimental rules and was officiated by then-Washburn head coach John H. Outland. The experimental rule requiring a first down be achieved in three downs rather than four was regarded as a failure and a primary reason for the game to have ended in a scoreless tie; however the rule allowing the ball to be thrown forward under certain conditions was retained in the overall recodification and revision undertaken when the National Collegiate Athletic Association was formed early the next year.

Southwestern
Bates was the sixth head football coach at Southwestern College in Winfield, Kansas, serving for 12 years, from 1914 to 1925, and compiling  record of 52–36–9.  He is the longest-tenured coach in Southwestern's football history having served as head coach for 102 games and was mentor for future Southwestern coach Art Kahler.

Bates also served as the head basketball coach at Southwestern for 12 seasons, from 1914 until 1926, where the Moundbuilders were considered one of the best basketball teams in the nation at the time.  His basketball teams amassed a record of 164–59 (.735).

Head coaching record

Football

References

External links
 

1880 births
1939 deaths
Southwestern Moundbuilders football coaches
Southwestern Moundbuilders men's basketball coaches
Wichita State Shockers baseball coaches
Wichita State Shockers football coaches
Wichita State Shockers men's basketball coaches